The 2016 World U20 Championships in Athletics was an international athletics competition for athletes qualifying as juniors (born no earlier than 1 January 1997) which was held at Zdzisław Krzyszkowiak Stadium in Bydgoszcz, Poland on 19–24 July 2016. It was the first time the competition had been held under the new name, having previously been known as World Junior Championships in Athletics.

The championships were originally awarded to Kazan, Russia before the hosting rights were withdrawn as a result of ARAF being suspended by the IAAF. Since then, three cities expressed an interest in hosting the championships; on 7 January 2016, the decision was made to reallocate the championships to Bydgoszcz as it was the only city to submit a bid.

The medal table was topped by the United States with 11 gold, 6 silver, and 4 bronze medals, followed by Kenya and Ethiopia.

Men's results

Track 

(World Junior Leader ) -(Championship Record) -( Area Junior Record )- (National Junior Record )( Personal Best)- (Season Best )

Field 

( World Junior Record ) -(World Junior Leader)  - (National Junior Record )-- (National Junior Record )-( Personal Best)- (Season Best )

Women's results

Track 

 WJL ( World Junior Leader ) -(Championship Record) -( Area Junior Record ) - (National Junior Record )- -( Personal Best)- (Season Best )

Field 

 WJL ( World Junior Leader ) -(Championship Record)-- (National Junior Record ) -( Personal Best)- (Season Best )

Medal table 

Notes
Updated after Konrad Bukowiecki disqualification in men's shot put.

Participation

References

External links
 Official Site

 
World Junior Championships
World Athletics U20 Championships
World Junior Championships
Sport in Bydgoszcz
International athletics competitions hosted by Poland
IAAF World U20 Championships
History of Bydgoszcz